Gwenllian ferch Gruffydd (Gwenllian, daughter of Gruffydd;  1100 – 1136) was Princess consort of Deheubarth in Wales, and married to Gruffydd ap Rhys, Prince of Deheubarth. Gwenllian was the daughter of Gruffudd ap Cynan (1055–1137), Prince of Gwynedd and Angharad ferch Owain, and a member of the princely Aberffraw family of Gwynedd. Gwenllian's "patriotic revolt" and subsequent death in battle at Kidwelly Castle contributed to the Great Revolt of 1136.

There are several notable artistic depictions of Gwenllian, often depicting her with a sword in hand, or riding a chariot into battle in the style of Boudicca. She is sometimes confused with Gwenllian ferch Llywelyn, who lived two centuries later.

Early life
Gwenllian was the youngest daughter of Gruffudd ap Cynan, Prince of Gwynedd, and his wife, Angharad. She was born on Ynys Môn at the family seat at Aberffraw, and was the youngest of eight children; four older sisters: Mared, Rhiannell, Susanna, and Annest, and three older brothers: Cadwallon, Owain and Cadwaladr. She was the great-great-great-granddaughter of Brian Bóruma mac Cennétig, High King of Ireland.

Gwenllian grew to be strikingly beautiful. After Gruffydd ap Rhys, the Prince of Deheubarth, ventured to Gwynedd around 1113 to meet her father, Gwenllian and Deheubarth's prince became romantically involved and eloped. She married Gruffydd ap Rhys shortly after 1116.
Gwenllian and Gruffydd had the following children:
 Morgan ap Gruffydd (c. 1116, Carmarthenshire – 1136)
 Maelgwyn ap Gruffydd (c. 1119, Carmarthenshire – 1136)
 Gwladus ferch Gruffydd (between 1120 and 1130, Carmarthenshire - after 25 July 1175)
 Nest ferch Gruffydd (between 1120 and 1130, Carmarthenshire - after 25 July 1175)
 Owain ap Gruffydd (c. 1126, Carmarthenshire - after 1155)
 Maredudd ap Gruffydd (c. 1130/1, Carmarthenshire – 1155)
 Rhys "Fychan" ap Gruffydd (c. 1132, Dynevor Castle, Llandeilo, Carmarthenshire – after 24 April 1197)
 Sion ap Gruffydd (c. 1134, Carmarthenshire - after 1155)

Gwenllian joined her husband at his family seat of Dinefwr in Deheubarth. Deheubarth was struggling against the Norman invasion in South Wales, with Norman, English, and Flemish colonists in footholds throughout the country. While the conflict between the Normans and the Welsh continued, the princely family were often displaced, with Gwenllian joining her husband in mountainous and forested strongholds. From here, she and Gruffydd ap Rhys led retaliatory strikes, aka "lightning raids" against Norman-held positions in Deheubarth.

Great Revolt 1136

By 1136 an opportunity arose for the Welsh to recover lands lost to the Marcher Lords when Stephen de Blois displaced his cousin, Empress Matilda, from succeeding her father to the English throne the year prior, sparking the Anarchy in England. The usurpation and conflict it caused eroded central authority in England. The revolt began in South Wales, as Hywel ap Maredudd, Lord of Brycheiniog, gathered his men and marched to Gower, defeating the Norman and English colonists there at the Battle of Llwchwr. Inspired by Hywel of Brycheiniog's success, Gruffydd ap Rhys hastened to meet with Gruffudd ap Cynan of Gwynedd, his father-in-law, to enlist his aid in the revolt.

While her husband was in Gwynedd seeking an alliance with her father against the Normans, Maurice de Londres and other Normans led raids against Deheubarth's Welsh and Gwenllian was compelled to raise an army for their defence. In a battle fought near Kidwelly Castle, Gwenllian's army was routed, she was captured in battle and beheaded by the Normans. In the battle her son Morgan was also slain and another son, Maelgwyn, captured and executed.

Though defeated, her patriotic revolt inspired others in South Wales to rise. The Welsh of Gwent, led by Iorwerth ab Owain (grandson of Caradog ap Gruffydd, Gwent's Welsh ruler displaced by the Norman invasions), ambushed and slew Richard Fitz Gilbert de Clare, the Norman lord who controlled Ceredigion.

When word reached Gwynedd of Gwenllian's death and the revolt in Gwent, Gwenllian's brothers Owain and Cadwaladr invaded Norman-controlled Ceredigion, taking Llanfihangel, Aberystwyth, and Llanbadarn.

Legacy
Gwenllian's actions have been compared with those of another Celtic leader: Boadicea (Buddug). Gwenllian is also the only woman of the medieval period who is known to have led a Welsh army into battle. The field where the battle is believed to have taken place, close to Kidwelly Castle and north of the town, is known as Maes Gwenllian. A spring in the field is also named after her, supposedly welling up on the spot where she died.

For centuries after her death, Welshmen cried-out Revenge for Gwenllian when engaging in battle. Gwenllian and her husband also harassed Norman, English, and Flemish colonists in Deheubarth, taking goods and money and redistributed them among the Deheubarth Welsh who were themselves dispossessed by those colonizers, like a pair of "Robin Hoods of Wales", as historian and author Philip Warner writes.

Gwenllian's youngest son went on to become a notable leader of Deheubarth, The Lord Rhys.

Authorship of the Mabinogi
Dr Andrew Breeze has argued that Gwenllian could have been the author of the Four Branches of the Mabinogi.

Ancestry

Sources
 
 
 
 
 
 Rockefeller, Laurel A (2015).  Gwenllian ferch Gruffydd: The Warrior Princess of Deheubarth.  CreateSpace Publishing.

References

1136 deaths
Welsh princesses
Medieval Welsh killed in battle
12th-century Welsh women
House of Aberffraw
1090s births
Mabinogion
People from Anglesey
11th-century Welsh people
12th-century Welsh people
11th-century Welsh women
Women in 12th-century warfare
House of Dinefwr
Uí Ímair
Welsh people of Irish descent
Women in medieval European warfare